Norbert Düwel (born 5 January 1968) is a German football manager who managed Laos.

Coaching career
In May 2014 it was announced that Düwel would replace Uwe Neuhaus as manager of Union Berlin. He was subsequently sacked on 31 August 2015. Union Berlin picked up four points from five matches to start the 2015–16 season. He finished with a record of 12 wins, 15 draws, and 14 losses.

Coaching record

Bibliography
 Norbert Düwel: Richtig Frauenfußball, BLV Verlag, 2005 (127 pages), 
 Norbert Düwel: Dribbeln, Passen, Schießen - Profi-Tipps für Kids, BLV Verlag, 2007 (119 pages),

References

External links
 Profile at Hannover 96's official website

1968 births
Living people
German football managers
2. Bundesliga managers
People from Altötting (district)
Sportspeople from Upper Bavaria
1. FC Union Berlin managers
German footballers
Association football forwards
SV Wacker Burghausen players
Footballers from Bavaria
Türkgücü München players